95.8 Central Radio is a Zimbabwean state owned provincial radio station that is based and operates in the Midlands Province's capital, Gweru.

References

Radio stations in Zimbabwe